Robert Anthony Ginnetti (born 31 July 1965) is a Canadian-born Italian ice hockey player. He competed in the men's tournament at the 1992 Winter Olympics.

Career statistics

References

External links
 

1965 births
Living people
EC Bad Tölz players
ERC Ingolstadt players
GIJS Groningen players
HC Milano Saima players
Italian ice hockey players
Olympic ice hockey players of Italy
Ice hockey players at the 1992 Winter Olympics
Ice hockey people from Vancouver
Vancouver Bluehawks players
Burnaby Bluehawks players
New Westminster Bruins players
Seattle Breakers players
HC Alleghe players
Canadian people of Italian descent